The Electoral Bloc Motherland (Blocul Electoral Patria - Rodina) was a communist electoral alliance in Moldova formed by the Socialist Party of Moldova (Partidul Socialist din Moldova) and the Party of Socialists of the Republic of Moldova (Partidul Socialiştilor din Republica Moldova)

In the legislative elections on 6 March 2005, the bloc won 4.9% of the popular vote but no seats.

Electoral results

References

External links
Official web site

Defunct political party alliances in Moldova
Communist parties in Moldova
Russian political parties in Moldova